or johatsu refers to the people in Japan who purposely vanish from their established lives without a trace.  This phenomenon can be seen all over the world, such as the United States, the United Kingdom, and Germany. However, it is likely more prevalent in Japan, given certain cultural factors.

Background 
It has been theorized that Japan's harsh work culture in combination with the lack of familial and community support has contributed to the prevalence of jouhatsu in Japan. Furthermore, quitting a company is seen as shameful in Japanese culture. Suicide, working to death (karoshi), and becoming jouhatsu are thus potential outcomes. It can also spare the family the high costs that can be associated with suicide (e.g. debts, cleanup fees, and disruption-of-service fees in the context of platform jumpers).

Similar societal pressures have been theorized to contribute to the prevalence of hikikomori and a relatively high suicide rate.

History 
The term jouhatsu started being used in the 1960s. At that time, it was used in the context of people who decided to escape unhappy marriages rather than endure formal divorce proceedings. The Lost Decade of the 1990s led to a spike in jouhatsu and suicide as many salarymen lost their jobs and/or accumulated debt.

Prevalence 
In Japan, the topic of jouhatsu is taboo in regular conversation, like the topic of suicide. It has been estimated that 100,000 Japanese people disappear annually. However, jouhatsu may be underreported in the official numbers. In 2015, Japan's National Police Agency had registered 82,000 missing persons, and 80,000 were found by the end of the year. In comparison, that same year, Britain had 300,000 calls to report a missing person, although it has about half of the population of Japan. Furthermore, a database of missing persons does not exist in Japan. 

The Missing Persons Search Support Association of Japan, a non-profit dedicated to support families of the jouhatsu, estimates hundreds of thousands of people go missing each year.

Motivation 
People become jouhatsu for a number of reasons, including depression, addiction, sexual impropriety, and desire for isolation. Sometimes, it is used to escape domestic violence, gambling debt, religious cults, stalkers, employers, and difficult family situations. The shame of job loss, divorce, and even failing an exam can also motivate people to disappear. 

In some cases, becoming jouhatsu is a way to just have a fresh start. When they disappear, they can abandon their former residences, jobs, families, names, and even appearances.

Industry 
The businesses that assist the jouhatsu are called yonige-ya, which means “fly-by-night shops”. These establishments are relatively accessible and have their own websites. One particular yonige-ya could charge between ¥50,000 ($450) and ¥300,000 ($2,600) for its services, which depend on a number of factors. These factors include: the amount of possessions, the distance, if it is a nocturnal move, if children are included, and if the client is evading debt collectors. Sometimes, people disappear on their own without the aid of yonige-ya. There are published guides that can help assist people become jouhatsu.

Detective agencies are sometimes used to find people who have become jouhatsu. Sometimes, people can be found spending time at pachinko parlors and cheap hotel rooms, and other times, they can be found to have committed suicide. San'ya, a skid row in Tokyo that previously housed thousands of day laborers, is reported to be a place of hiding for the jouhatsu. Kamagasaki in Osaka is another neighborhood that it is possible to live without an ID and so is also favored. 

These communities are Yakuza strongholds, since they have jobs that pay cash. Many times, especially in the setting of Japan's strict privacy laws, the jouhatsu are unable to be found. Most jouhatsu court cases are civil cases, and personal data is not easily accessed. Police will not interfere unless there is a crime or accident.

See also 
 A Man Vanishes
 Missing person

References

Further reading
 
 
 
 

Japanese words and phrases

 
Society of Japan